Faith Academy may refer to:

Faith Academy, Delhi, India
Faith Academy, New Zealand
Faith Academy, Gowon Estate, Nigeria 
Faith Academy, Ota, Nigeria 
Faith Academy (Mobile, Alabama), U.S.

See also